René Miller is a German artist, multi-instrumentalist, and songwriter.

He has co-written songs for artists such as Zoe Wees, Topic, A7S, Mike Perry, and Jack Curley.

In 2018, he was a recipient of the German Songwriting Award. In 2019, he signed a worldwide publishing deal with Sony/ATV Germany.

Notable songs written by Miller include "Control" by Zoe Wees & "Breaking Me" by Topic & A7S. "Control" charted in several nations including number 1 in France (SNEP Radio), and has achieved Platinum certification.

He is a close collaborator of Zoe Wees.

In 2023, Miller participated in Unser Lied für Liverpool, the German national selection for Eurovision Song Contest 2023 with the song "Concrete Heart". He finished 7th in the final, placing 3rd with the international juries.

Songwriting discography 
As per Tidal credits

Artist discography 
As per Tidal credits

References 

German songwriters
21st-century German male musicians
Year of birth missing (living people)
Living people
People from Filderstadt